Fletcher C. Johnson is an American songwriter based in Brooklyn, New York. In live settings, Johnson performs with his eponymously-named three piece band.

Career 
Fletcher C. Johnson grew up in Brattleboro, Vermont before relocating to Brooklyn. In concert, Fletcher C. Johnson is joined by Todd Martin on bass, John Dougherty on drums, and Adam Meisterhans on lead guitar. Johnson's debut album, Salutations was released on Burger Records in 2012. In 2013, Burger released Johnson's sophomore album It Rained Something Wicked. Fletcher C. Johnson's third album Lesson In Tenderness, which took three years to complete, was recorded after an extensive tour of the East Coast of the United States. Fletcher C. Johnson has shared stages with Parquet Courts and King Gizzard & The Lizard Wizard.

Discography 

 Salutations (2012)
 It Rained Something Wicked (2013)
 Lessons in Tenderness (2016)

References 

Place of birth missing (living people)
20th-century American singers
Living people
Singers from New York City
21st-century American guitarists
American male drummers
American male guitarists
21st-century American singers
20th-century American male singers
21st-century American male singers
Year of birth missing (living people)